The 2002 Tasmanian state election was held on 20 July 2002.

Retiring Members

Labor
 Gill James MHA (Bass)
 Peter Patmore MHA (Bass)

Liberal
 Bill Bonde MHA (Braddon)
 Tony Rundle MHA (Braddon)
 Matt Smith MHA (Franklin)

House of Assembly
Sitting members are shown in bold text. Tickets that elected at least one MHA are highlighted in the relevant colour. Successful candidates are indicated by an asterisk (*).

Bass
Five seats were up for election. The Labor Party was defending three seats. The Liberal Party was defending two seats.

Braddon
Five seats were up for election. The Labor Party was defending three seats. The Liberal Party was defending two seats.

Denison
Five seats were up for election. The Labor Party was defending two seats. The Liberal Party was defending two seats. The Greens were defending one seat.

Franklin
Five seats were up for election. The Labor Party was defending three seats. The Liberal Party was defending two seats.

Lyons
Five seats were up for election. The Labor Party was defending three seats. The Liberal Party was defending two seats.

See also
 Members of the Tasmanian House of Assembly, 1998–2002
 Members of the Tasmanian House of Assembly, 2002–2006

References
Tasmanian Electoral Commission 2006 Election

Candidates for Tasmanian state elections